AutoSolo in the United Kingdom is a form of Motorsport-based around the principles of autotesting, the main differences being that the tests are run in a forward direction only and are usually slightly faster and more open than traditional Autotests. Courses are usually larger than those for Autotesting, and as the courses are laid out to run in one direction, it is common for more than 1 car to be on the course at the same time.
Autosolos are similar to the popular American motorsport of autocross also formerly-known as Solo2.  Solo2 is a registered service mark of the Sports Car Club of America (SCCA).  SCCA now refers to this sport simply as "Solo".  The generic term used in the US is "Autocross".

As with all motorsports in the UK, Autosolos are governed by the Motor Sports Association (MSA) and regulations for them are listed under 'Part M Autotests 'of the 'Blue Book'.

External links 
 BTRDA Autosolo 
 Farnborough District Motor Club - Autosolo

Auto racing by type
Motorsport in the United Kingdom